The GER Class E22 was a class of twenty  Steam locomotives designed by James Holden for the Great Eastern Railway.  They passed to the London and North Eastern Railway at the grouping in 1923 and received the LNER classification J65.

History
These had  coupled wheels,  cylinders and were lighter than the T18 (LNER J66) class. 

They were reboilered between 1889 and 1912. The Macallan variable blastpipe was removed from 1924. They ran as s on the Fenchurch Street to Blackwall service and were sometimes known as Blackwall Tanks. They operated on the Stoke Ferry, Eye and Mid-Suffolk Light Railway branches. Withdrawals started in 1930, and by 1937 fifteen had been withdrawn, but there were no more retirements for ten years. In 1944 the five surviving locomotives were renumbered 8211–8215 in order of construction. These last five were withdrawn between 1947 and 1956, when the class became extinct.

References

Notes

Bibliography

External links
  — Great Eastern Railway Society
 The Holden J65 (GER Class E22) 0-6-0T Locomotives — LNER Encyclopedia

E22
0-6-0T locomotives
Railway locomotives introduced in 1889
Scrapped locomotives
Standard gauge steam locomotives of Great Britain